3LHD is an architectural firm based in Zagreb, Croatia. The studio was responsible for designing many public and business objects throughout the country and abroad, is known for its simplicity and contemporary visual look in architecture. 3LHD was founded in 1994 in Zagreb, by a generation of contemporary Croatian architects.  The founding partners are: Saša Begović, Marko Dabrović, Tatjana Grozdanić Begović and Silvije Novak. In 2016 they appointed a new partner, Paula Kukuljica.

Their debut on the scene went with the realization of the Award-winning project Memorial Bridge in Rijeka.

Practice 
3LHD is an architectural firm, focused on integrating various disciplines – architecture, urban planning, design and art. 3LHD architects constantly explore new possibilities of interaction between architecture, society and individuals. With a contemporary approach, the team of architects resolves all projects in cooperation with many experts from various disciplines.

Projects, such as Memorial Bridge in Rijeka, Croatian Pavilion at EXPO 2005 in Japan and EXPO 2008 in Spain, Riva Waterfront in Split, Sports Hall Bale in Istria, Zamet Centre in Rijeka, Dance Centre in Zagreb, Hotel Lone in Rovinj, Freshwater Aquarium in Karlovac, LN Garden Hotel in China and Grand Park Hotel Rovinj are some of the important projects that have established 3LHD not only in the professional circles but also in the wider public circles.

The work of 3LHD has received important Croatian and international awards, including the A+Award in the Architecture +Landscape category 2017, the award for best building in Sport category on first World Architecture Festival WAF 2008, IOC/IAKS Bronze Medal Award 2009 for best architectural achievement of facilities intended for sports and recreation, AR Emerging Architecture Award (UK), the ID Magazine Award (USA); and Croatian professional awards Drago Galić (2013; 2008), Bernando Bernardi (2009; 2005), Viktor Kovačić (2019; 2011; 2001), and Vladimir Nazor (2019; 2009; 1999). In 2012 Croatian President Ivo Josipović awarded 3LHD with the Charter of the Republic of Croatia for an exceptional and successful promotion of contemporary architecture in Croatia and abroad.

They represented Croatia at the Venice Biennale 2010, 12th International architecture exhibition with the group of authors, and took part in the 2008 ‘Mare Nostrum’ exhibition on the second International Architecture Biennale in Rotterdam, and in a group exhibition in Boston at Harvard University: "New trajectories: Contemporary Architecture in Croatia and Slovenia".

3LHD's projects have been presented in reputable international and Croatian magazines and journals, such as Japanese A+U, British The Architectural Review, German DB, Italian The Plan, Croatian Oris; and also in many architectural portals and web pages.

3LHD architects are actively involved in teaching and have been visiting lecturers and critics in numerous cities and institutions such as ETH in Zurich, Berlage Institute in Rotterdam, RIBA London and Architectural Faculties and Universities such as Harvard and Northeastern University in Boston, technical universities in Vienna and Munich. Currently, the office partners are Guest Professors at GAF Architectural Faculty, University of Split, at Architecture Faculty, University of Zagreb, Croatia and Cornell University. Their work has been presented in Vienna, London and New York. Given the intense activity of 3LHD in the past ten years, a number of relevant and successful projects are still awaiting realization.

Notable projects

Completed

 Memorial Bridge, Rijeka, Croatia (1997–2001)
 Villa Klara, Zagreb, Croatia (1997–2001)
 Kozala Square and Service Building, Rijeka, Croatia (2002–2007)
 Croatian pavilion EXPO 2005 in Japan, (2004–2005)
 Zagreb Dance Centre, Zagreb, Croatia (2003–2009) 
 House U, Dubrovnik, Croatia (2006–2012)
 House V2, Dubrovnik, Croatia (2004–2013)
 Zamet Centre, Rijeka, Croatia (2005–2009) 
 House J2, Zagreb, Croatia (2005–2009) 
 House K, Zagreb, Croatia (2004–2008)
 Bale Sport Hall, Bale (town), Croatia (2005–2007) 
 Split Waterfront, Split (2006–2007)
 Sveti Vid Housing, Rovinj, Croatia (2006–2008)
 Hotel Lone, Rovinj, Croatia (2006–2011) 
 Spaladium Arena, Split, Croatia (2007–2008)
 Croatian pavilion EXPO 2008 in Spain, Zaragoza, (2006–2008)
 Ski Restaurant Raduša, Uskoplje, Bosnia and Hercegovina (2010–2011)
 Green Pavilion_Restaurant, Zagreb, Croatia (2010–2019)
 Amarin Apartment Village, Rovinj, Croatia (2012–2013)
 Cedevita training camp, Zagreb, Croatia (2012–2012)
 One Suite Hotel, Srebreno, Croatia (2009–2017)
 Lone Outdoor Pool, Rovinj, Croatia (2011–2013)
 Mulini Beach, Rovinj, Croatia (2012–2014)
 Hotel Dubrovnik Palace Renovation, Dubrovnik, Croatia (2013–2014)
 Grand Park Hotel Rovinj, Rovinj, Croatia (2011–2019)
 Janković Manor, Suhopolje, Croatia (2013–2019)
 Karlovac Freshwater Aquarium and Museum of Rivers, Karlovac, Croatia (2013–2016)
 Hotel LN Garden, Guangzhou, China (2014–2018)
 Hotel Adriatic, Rovinj, Croatia (2014) 
 Đurđevac Sports and Recreation Center, Đurđevac, Croatia (2014–2019)
 3LHD Interactions, Zagreb, Croatia (2015–2016)
 ACI Marina Rovinj, Rovinj, Croatia (2014–2019)
 EU Council Promenade, Rovinj, Croatia (2015–2019)
 Public square, pier and Island Reception, Rovinj, Croatia (2015–2019)
 Bužanova Apartments, Zagreb, Croatia (2016–2018)
 ResoLution Signature Restaurant, Rovinj, Croatia (2016–2017)
 Urania, Zagreb, Croatia (2017–2019)

Ongoing and future 

 Bus Terminal Žabica, Rijeka, Croatia (2008)
 4_Towers, Zagreb, Croatia (2010)
 Belvedere Hotel, Dubrovnik, Croatia (2014)
 Kupari Masterplan, Kupari, Croatia (2018)
 Viale Market, Poreč, Croatia (2017)
 K District, Belgrade, Serbia (2018)
 Campus Infobip, Zagreb, Croatia (2018)
 reconstruction of Westin Hotels & Resorts Hotel Westin in Zagreb, Croatia (2018)
 Campus Rimac for Rimac Automobili, Sv. Nedelja, Croatia (2019)
 Hotel Marjan, Split, Croatia (2019)
 Park Kneževa, Zagreb, Croatia (2020)
 SDMS Headquarters, Sv. Nedelja, Croatia (2020)
 Reconstruction of the Grignano Waterfront, Grignano, Trieste, Italy (2020)

Concepts

 xCimos Office Building, Zagreb, Croatia (2009)
 Eastern European Center of Culture, China, Xi’an (2006)
 Tower 123, Zagreb, Croatia (2006)
 Kajzerica City Stadium, Zagreb, Croatia (2008)
 Duilovo Waterfront Masterplan, Split, Croatia (2009)
 Campus B, Zagreb, Croatia (2010)
 Mali Maj, Poreč, Croatia (2011)
 Čakovec City Centre Study, Čakovec, Croatia (2013)
 Delta and Porto Baroš, Rijeka, Croatia (2013)
 Dojran Masterplan, Dojran, Macedonia (2014)
 Struga Masterplan, Struga, Macedonia (2014)
 Novalja Urban Development Study, Novalja, Croatia (2014.)
 Spatial Study of the Brseč Tourist Zone, Brseč, Croatia (2014)
 Cultural Centre Sv Nedelja, Sveta Nedelja, Croatia (2014)
 Hotel Helios, Lošinj, Croatia (2015)
 Riva Poreč, Poreč, Croatia (2016)
 Clelia Tower, Limassol, Cyprus (2018)
 Delta Park, Rijeka, Croatia (2019)
 InfobipSA, Sarajevo, Bosnia and Herzegovina (2020)

Awards 

 Hotel Property Award 2020 for Grand Park Hotel Rovinj
 Annual Vladimir Nazor Award 2019 for Urania
 Medal for urbanism 2019 for Grand Park Hotel Rovinj
 Annual Viktor Kovacic Award 2019 for Urania
 Elle decoration "best architecture and design“ award for Grand Park Hotel Rovinj
 ECOtechGREEN Award 2019 for Karlovac Freshwater Aquarium and Grand Park Hotel Rovin
 BIG SEE interior award 2018 for Resolution Signature Restaurant and Hotel Adriatic
 International Hospitality Award 2017 for "opening of the year" for One Suite Hotel
 Balkan Biennale of Architecture 2017 Grand Prix in the category "best built project" for Karlovac Freshwater Aquarium
 Medal for the conceptual project awarded by Croatian Chamber of Architects for the project of the exhibition 3LHD interactions
 A+Award in the Architecture +Landscape category for the Karlovac Freshwater Aquarium
 A+Popular Choice Award in the Architecture +Landscape category for the Karlovac Freshwater Aquarium
 Special Mention ARTUR Conference 2016 for the Mulini Beach
 CEMEX Building Award 2015 for the Mulini Beach
 ELLE style award in the "best architect" for the Mulini Beach
 Rexpo Adriatic 2015 Best New Hotel Award for Hotel Adriatic
 50th Zagreb Salon Award for the Novalja Development Study
 CEMEX Building Award 2015 Croatia for the Mulini Beach
 Special mention ARTUR Conference for the Karlovac Freshwater Aquarium
 CAA Realizations 2013 - Drago Galić Award for House V2
 IOC Trophy for Sport and Sustainable Development 2012 for Sports Hall Bale
 47th Zagreb Salon of Architecture Award for Hotel Lone
 International Hotel Award 2012 for the best congress hotel in Europe for Hotel Lone
 European Hotel Design Award 2012 for the best new built hotel for Hotel Lone
 Oris Award 2012 for outstanding creative contribution to architecture for Hotel Lone
 Charter of the Republic of Croatia for an exceptional and successful promotion of contemporary architecture in Croatia and abroad
 CAA Realizations 2011 - Viktor Kovačić Award for Hotel Lone
 IOC / IAKS Award 2011 Silver medal for Centre Zamet
 Ministry of Culture of the Republic of Croatia Annual Vladimir Nazor Award 2009 for Centre Zamet
 CAA Realizations 2009 - Bernardo Bernardi Award for Centre Zamet
 IOC / IAKS Award 2009 - Bronze medal for Sports Hall Bale
 CAA Realizations 2008 - Drago Galić Award for House J2
 World Architecture Festival Sport Category Award 2008 for Sports Hall Bale
 CAA Realizations 2005 - Bernardo Bernardi Award for Croatian Pavilion on EXPO 2005
 I.D. Annual Design Review 2003 for the Memorial Bridge
 AR+D Award 2002 
 CAA Realizations 2001 - Viktor Kovačić Award for the Memorial Bridge
 Ministry of Culture of the Republic of Croatia Annual Vladimir Nazor Award 1999 for Vila Klara

References

External links 
 
 2002 AR+D prize 
 2003 ID magazine 2003 prize 
 2008 WAF Barcelona prize
 IOC/IAKS Award

Architecture firms of Croatia
Design companies established in 1994
Companies based in Zagreb
Croatian companies established in 1994